Armer is a surname. Notable people with the surname include:

Alan Armer (1922–2010), American television writer, producer, and director
Elinor Armer (born 1939), American pianist, music educator and composer
Laura Adams Armer (1874–1963), American artist and writer
Ruth Armer (1896–1977), American painter, teacher, art collector, and lithographer